Win Theingi Tun (born 1 February 1995) is a Burmese international footballer who last played as a forward for Thailand Women's League club BG Bundit Asia and the Myanmar national team. Besides Myanmar, she has played in Thailand and India.

She is ranked 20th in the list of top international women's football goal scorers by country, and is the current all-time top scorer of Myanmar Women League and India Women's League.

Club career

Myawady 
Win Theingi Tun played for Burmese club Myawady from 2016 to 2019. She became the Myanmar Women League's all-time top scorer with 87 goals.

Gokulam Kerala FC 
Win Theingi Tun played for Indian club Gokulam Kerala from October 2021 to May 2022, scoring 18 goals in 9 games.

Lords FA 
On 11 August 2022, Win Theingi Tun moved from Gokulam Kerala to Lords FA on a three-month contract; she was the first Burmese female player to play abroad. Lords FA, who were competing in the 2022–23 Kerala Women's League, played against Bosco FA in their season opener on 11 August; they won the match 12–2, with Win Theingi Tun coming on as a starter and scoring four goals.

She set a new record as she scored 11 goals for Lords FA in their 33–1 win against Kadathanad Raja on 17 September. In the following match, Win Theingi Tun scored 15 goals and assisted 5 against SBFA Poovar on September 25, breaking her previous record of 11 goals in 1 match.

Thitsar Arman 
On 2022, She returned to Myanmar, scoring 13 goals in 4 games for Thitsar Arman. She became the Myanmar Women League's all-time top scorer with 100 goals.

BG Bundit Asia 
On February 1, She joined Thailand Women's League club BG Bundit Asia.

Career statistics

Club

International

Honours
Myanmar
 Women's Gold Cup: 2019
 AFF Women's Championship silver medal: 2015; bronze medal: 2016, 2019, 2022
 Southeast Asian Games bronze medal: 2017, 2019

Myawady
 Myanmar Women League: 2016-17, 2017–18; runner-up: 2018–19

Gokulam Kerala
Indian Women's League: 2021–22
AFC Women's Club Championship third place: 2021

Lords FA
Kerala Women's League: 2022–23

Thitsar Arman
 Myanmar Women League: runner-up: 2022

References

External links 
 

1995 births
Living people
Women's association football midfielders
Burmese women's footballers
Myanmar women's international footballers
Southeast Asian Games bronze medalists for Myanmar
Southeast Asian Games medalists in football
Competitors at the 2007 Southeast Asian Games
Competitors at the 2017 Southeast Asian Games
Competitors at the 2019 Southeast Asian Games
Gokulam Kerala FC Women players
Burmese expatriate sportspeople in India
Burmese expatriate women's footballers
Expatriate women's footballers in India
Indian Women's League players